Bellino Giusto Ghirard (22 May 1935 − 26 July 2013) was a French Roman Catholic bishop. 

Ordained to the priesthood in 1962, Ghirard was appointed coadjutor bishop of the Roman Catholic Diocese of Rodez, France, in 1990 and succeeded to the diocese in 1991 retiring in 2011.

References

1935 births
2013 deaths
People from Lot-et-Garonne
Bishops of Rodez